Natalia Margaret Haddock (born 6 November 1996), better known as Talia Mar, is a British singer-songwriter and internet personality. Her collaboration with Sigala on "Stay the Night" charted at No. 11 on the UK Singles Chart. As of 1 November 2022, Mar has 1.31 million subscribers between her two YouTube channels and over 143 million total views. On Twitch, she has over 700 thousand followers and over 22 million views.

Career 
Mar released her first studio single "Stolen" on 30 June 2016, along with a music video released on 24 November 2016. "In the Day", Mar's second studio single was released on 23 March 2017. Mar then released her debut EP titled "Tough Decisions" on 30 June 2017, exactly one year after the release of her debut single. On 14 March 2017, Mar released single "The Voices Are Me" after she struggled to discuss her own battle with the taboo subject following her friend's suicide.

On 15 May 2018, Mar launched The Martian Club, her online clothing retailer. On 10 December 2018, Mar announced across social media that she joined the panelists of the British television series, All Together Now's second series alongside Geri Halliwell. 

In 2019, Mar collaborated with OFRA Cosmetics to release two highlighters and a skincare line, called OFRA x Talia Mar. Mar then released many singles, such as "Selfish" on 7 June 2019, "Better" on 26 July 2019, and "Diamonds" on 18 October 2019. Mar also featured on KSI and Randolph's collaboration album New Age.

Mar was a finalist in the Breakout YouTuber category for the 12th Annual Shorty Awards hosted on 3 May 2020.

On 20 May 2022, Mar released "Stay the Night" alongside British DJ Sigala. The song peaked at No. 11 on the UK charts and No. 22 on the Irish Charts, making it her most successful song to date. On 20 October Mar announced she had become an ambassador for British clothing brand, Pretty Little Thing. On 28 October 2022 Mar released a single with British DJ Nathan Dawe titled "Sweet Lies". The song peaked at No. 61 on the UK charts.

On 21 February 2023 Mar announced across her social media platforms that she will be releasing a new single.

Personal life
Mar has been in a relationship with Sidemen member Simon "Miniminter" Minter since 2017, but their relationship was not public until early 2018. On 24 June 2022 it was announced the couple were engaged via Instagram. They moved in together in February 2022.

Discography

Extended plays

Singles

As lead artist

As featured artist

Other charted songs

Music videos

Filmography

References

External links 
 
 
 

1996 births
21st-century English singers
21st-century English women singers
Actresses from London
English people of Italian descent
English women pop singers
English women singer-songwriters
Gaming YouTubers
Let's Players
Living people
People educated at the BRIT School
Singers from London
Twitch (service) streamers
YouTubers from London